John E. Hammond (born June 27, 1960 in Bromley, Kent, England) is retired a Thoroughbred horse trainer in France.

Based in Chantilly, Oise throughout his training career, which began in 1987, Hammond trained numerous Group One winners including Montjeu and Suave Dancer, both of whom won the Prix de l'Arc de Triomphe, France's most prestigious horse race. Hammond's horses also won important races in Ireland, Great Britain and the United States.

Hammond also trained useful European and latterly American-based sprinter, Nuclear Debate. Hammond retired from training at the end of the 2019 season.

Major wins
 France
 Grand Prix de Saint-Cloud - (1) - Montjeu (2000)
 Prix de l'Abbaye de Longchamp - (1) - Imperial Beauty (2001)
 Prix de l'Arc de Triomphe - (2) - Suave Dancer (1991), Montjeu (1999)
 Prix du Cadran - (1) - Sought Out (1992)
 Prix de la Forêt - (1) - Dolphin Street (1993)
 Prix Ganay - (1) - Execute (2004)
 Prix du Jockey Club - (2) - Suave Dancer (1991), Montjeu (1999)
 Prix Maurice de Gheest - (2) - Dolphin Street (1994), Cherokee Rose (1995)
 Prix de l'Opéra - (1) - Insight (1998)
 Prix Vermeille - (1) - Sweet Stream (2004)

 Canada
 Canadian International - (1) - Sarah Lynx (2011)
 E. P. Taylor Stakes - (1) - Insight (1999)

 Great Britain
 Haydock Sprint Cup - (3) - Polar Falcon (1991), Cherokee Rose (1995), Nuclear Debate (2001)
 King George VI and Queen Elizabeth Stakes - (1) - Montjeu (2000)
 King's Stand Stakes - (1) - Nuclear Debate (2000)
 Lockinge Stakes - (1) - Polar Falcon (1991)
 Nunthorpe Stakes - (1) - Nuclear Debate (2000)

 Hong Kong
 Hong Kong Vase - (1) - Red Bishop (1994)

 Ireland
 Irish Champion Stakes - (1) - Suave Dancer (1991)
 Irish Derby - (1) - Montjeu (1999)
 Tattersalls Gold Cup - (1) - Montjeu (2000)

 United States
 Arlington Million - (1) - Dear Doctor (1992)
 Laurel Futurity - (1) - River Traffic (1990)

References

 NTRA.com

French horse trainers
British emigrants to France
People from Bromley
1960 births
Living people
British racehorse trainers